The Senator Patricia McGovern Transportation Center, also known as the McGovern Transportation Center or simply Lawrence station, is a transit station in Lawrence, Massachusetts. It serves the MBTA Commuter Rail's Haverhill Line. The modern station, which opened in 2005, is the latest of seven distinct stations located in Lawrence since 1848; it is located in the city's Gateway District.

History

Early stations
The city of Lawrence was chartered in 1846, several years after the Boston & Maine Railroad opened. In 1848, the original tracks from Ballardvale to North Andover were abandoned and the route was relocated to the modern routing through Lawrence south of the Merrimack River. That year, the B&M set a land speed record for railed vehicles by operating the first authenticated 60 mph (96.6 km/h) train, The Antelope, from Boston to Lawrence, travelling 26 miles in 26 minutes.

The first station in Lawrence, South Lawrence, was a wooden structure built in 1848 just north of Salem Street. It was enlarged just two years after construction, then replaced in 1872 by a brick depot between Salem and Andover Streets.

In 1849, the Manchester and Lawrence Railroad was built from South Lawrence depot north through Lawrence proper. A new station was located at Essex Street and named North Lawrence; the original wooden building was replaced in 1851 by a permanent building (similar to the depot at Andover) then in 1879 by a Victorian Gothic brick structure. In 1880, the Boston and Lowell Railroad extended the 1848-built Lowell and Lawrence Railroad to a new depot north of the Merrimack River on Canal Street. After the B&M absorbed the B&L in 1887 the depot became redundant, though it saw service until 1918. Passenger service on the Lawrence & Lowell ended in 1926.

Consolidation
In 1931, the Boston & Maine consolidated the existing South and North Lawrence into a single station, Lawrence, located off Parker Street. The tall brick and marble building, technically located at 65 Merrimack Street still stands as part of a strip mall. Regular Manchester & Lawrence service ended in 1953, and after January 18, 1965, service to Boston was reduced to a single daily round trip. Service on the Haverhill Line past Reading was cut in June 1976, ending service to Lawrence. However, the MBTA bought BM commuter assets in December 1976, and the 1979 energy crisis prompted a return of service. Service returned on December 17, 1979, including the resumption of the Lawrence stop. A mini-high platform for accessibility was added around 1992.

McGovern Transportation Center
On December 6, 2005, the Senator Patricia McGovern Transportation Center opened with a new Lawrence train station a quarter mile to the east, replacing the former station. The old platform is still extant, slowly rusting away.

Service to the station is at a single full-length high-level platform on the north side of the tracks. After the station was built in 2005, there was also a temporary platform located on the south side of the tracks, but locals were unhappy with having to cross active tracks to reach the garage from the platform. The second platform was removed from service after several years and was demolished when Pan Am built a second freight track through the station around 2010. With freight trains now on their dedicated tracks, the single passenger track is sufficient for current service levels. A similar platform was built in 2014 for use during track work on the line.

Bus connections
No MBTA bus routes serve the station. The Merrimack Valley Regional Transit Authority operates several local routes in Lawrence. Most operate out of the Buckley Transportation Center in Lawrence proper, but routes 33 and 39B also stop at McGovern Transportation Center. Route 99 (Boston commuter service) stops at McGovern, but not at Buckley.

References

External links

MBTA - Lawrence
MVRTA - Senator Patricia McGovern Transportation Center
Station platform and garage on Google Maps Street View
Photo set of the building of the 1931 station

Stations along Boston and Maine Railroad lines
Buildings and structures in Lawrence, Massachusetts
MBTA Commuter Rail stations in Essex County, Massachusetts
Railway stations in the United States opened in 1931
Railway stations in the United States opened in 2005
1931 establishments in Massachusetts
2005 establishments in Massachusetts